Cadre may refer to:
Cadre (military), a group of officers or NCOs around whom a unit is formed, or a training staff
Cadre (politics), a politically controlled appointment to an institution in order to circumvent the state and bring control to the party
Cadre (company), a New York-based real estate financial technology firm
Adam Cadre, an American writer
CADRE Laboratory for New Media at San Jose State University
Constructor Acquires Destructor Releases, alternate name for Resource Acquisition Is Initialization programming idiom